Qinghe County is located in the south of Hebei province, China, bordering Shandong province to the east. It is the easternmost county-level division of the prefecture-level city of Xingtai.

Administrative divisions
Towns:
Gexianzhuang, Lianzhuang, Youfang, Xielu, Wangguanzhuang, Baying

Climate

References

External links
Qinghe Xian official website of Qinghe County, Hebei Province, China

County-level divisions of Hebei
Xingtai